Li Weiyue (李惟岳) (died March 9, 782) was the son of the Chinese Tang Dynasty general Li Baochen.  After Li Baochen's death in 781, Li Weiyue tried to succeed his father as the de facto ruler of Chengde Circuit (成德, headquartered in modern Shijiazhuang, Hebei) and waged a campaign against the imperial government when Emperor Dezong refused to let him do so.  In 782, with his losses mounting, his own officer Wang Wujun killed him and submitted to the imperial government.

Background 
It is not known when Li Weiyue was born.  He was not Li Baochen's oldest son — as his half-brother Li Weicheng (李惟誠) was older than he was — but as Li Weiyue was born of Li Baochen's wife and Li Weicheng was not, Li Weiyue was considered Li Baochen's proper heir.  Li Weiyue also had at least one younger brother, Li Weijian (李惟簡).

Li Baochen had been a general of the rebel state Yan during the Anshi Rebellion, but in 762 submitted to Tang imperial authority and was made the military governor (Jiedushi) of Chengde Circuit.  He effectively ruled the circuit as his own domain, semi-independent from the imperial government, and he wanted to eventually pass the circuit to Li Weiyue.  During the time that Li Baochen served as military governor, Li Weiyue served as commander of the forces (行軍司馬, Xingjun Sima) as well as the prefect of Chengde's capital prefecture Heng Prefecture (恆州).  Li Weiyue was considered young and weak in personality, so, as Li Baochen aged, he began to kill a number of officers that he viewed as potential threats to Li Weiyue.  The only two major officers who escaped this fate were Zhang Xiaozhong (who escaped the fate by remaining at his garrison at Yi Prefecture (易州, in modern Baoding, Hebei), refusing to return to Heng Prefecture even when Li Baochen summoned him multiple times) and Wang Wujun (whose son Wang Shizhen was a son-in-law to Li Baochen and brother-in-law to Li Weiyue).

Resistance against Emperor Dezong 
Li Baochen died in spring 781, and initially, Li Weiyue did not announce Li Baochen's death but forged a petition from Li Baochen, requesting that Li Weiyue be allowed to succeed him.  Emperor Dezong refused and sent the imperial official Ban Hong (班宏) to visit Li Baochen.  When Ban arrived in Chengde, he realized that Li Baochen had died, and Li Weiyue tried to bribe him to make a recommendation that Li Weiyue be allowed to inherit Li Baochen's position.  Ban refused, and after he returned to the capital Chang'an and reported this to Emperor Dezong, Li Weiyue announced Li Baochen's death and claimed the title of acting military governor.  He had his subordinates submit a petition requesting that he be made military governor; Emperor Dezong rejected that petition as well.

Li Weiyue thus prepared for war against the imperial government, along with several military governors who were also ruling their circuits semi-independently and who had previously entered into alliances with Li Baochen — Li Zhengji the military governor of Pinglu Circuit (平盧, headquartered in modern Tai'an, Shandong), Tian Yue the military governor of Weibo Circuit (魏博, headquartered in modern Handan, Hebei), and Liang Chongyi the military governor of Shannan East Circuit (山南東道, headquartered in modern Xiangfan, Hubei).  Li Baochen's secretary Shao Zhen (邵真), hearing of these plans, tearfully begged Li Weiyue to reconsider, and suggested that he arrest Li Zhengji's messengers and deliver them to Chang'an, believing that by doing so, Li Weiyue might gain sufficient imperial trust that his request might be accepted.  The secretary general Bi Hua (畢華), however, argued that the imperial government might still not trust Li Weiyue anyway, and if Li Zhengji then attacked, Chengde would be defenseless, and Li Weiyue agreed with Bi.  Li Weiyue's uncle Gu Congzheng (古從政) also opposed resisting the imperial government; he suggested that Li Weiyue should leave Li Weicheng temporarily in charge of the circuit and personally head to Chang'an to pay homage to Emperor Dezong in order to gain imperial trust.  Li Weiyue refused, and Gu committed suicide.  Subsequently, Tian sent his officer Meng You (孟祐), along with 5,000 soldiers, north to aid Li Weiyue in defense of Chengde, while he himself launched preemptive attacks on Zhaoyi Circuit (昭義, headquartered in Changzhi, Shanxi), then controlled by the imperial general Li Baozhen.

By fall 781, however, Tian himself was suffering defeats at the hand of Ma Sui and Li Baozhen, such that he actually needed aid from both Li Weiyue and Li Zhengji's son and successor Li Na (Li Zhengji's having died by that time as well).  Meanwhile, pursuant to Emperor Dezong's orders, Zhu Tao the acting military governor of Lulong Circuit (盧龍, headquartered in modern Beijing), had launched a campaign against Chengde.  Zhu was quickly able to persuade Zhang Xiaozhong to surrender Yi Prefecture to the imperial cause.  Emperor Dezong named Zhang the new military governor of Chengde and ordered that Li Weiyue escort Li Baochen's casket to Chang'an.  Li Weiyue refused.  In winter 781, Emperor Dezong formally declared Li Weiyue a renegade and removed all of his titles; he also decreed that those who turned against Li Weiyue would be pardoned and awarded.

In spring 782, despite the defense put up by joint Chengde and Weibo troops, Zhu and Zhang captured Shulu (束鹿, in modern Shijiazhuang) and then put Shen Prefecture (深州, in modern Hengshui, Hebei) under siege.  Li Weiyue became deeply worried, and Shao again suggested to him that he submit to the imperial government — that he first send Li Weijian to Chang'an to declare his intent, and then kill the officers who would not agree, leave his father-in-law Zheng Shen (鄭詵) in charge of the circuit, and personally head to Chang'an to pay homage to Emperor Dezong.  Li Weiyue agreed and had Shao draft a petition.  However, the news leaked, and Meng informed this to Tian.  Tian was incensed and sent his staff member Hu Ji (扈岌) to Li Weiyue, demanding Shao's death.  Li Weiyue, in fear, beheaded Shao in Hu's presence, with Bi's encouragement.  He then commanded 10,000 soldiers himself and joined forces with Meng, trying to recapture Shulu, with Wang Wujun as his forward commander.  By this point, though, there had been rumors that Wang would turn against Li Weiyue.  Wang, fearing that Li Weiyue would believe these rumors, intentionally did not use his best efforts in attacking Shulu.  Subsequently, Zhu and Zhang arrived and defeated Li Weiyue, forcing him to flee back to Heng Prefecture.

Li Weiyue began to suspect Wang, particularly after yet another officer, Kang Rizhi (康日知), surrendered Zhao Prefecture (趙州, in modern Shijiazhuang) to the imperial cause, but his staff members urged him not to suspect Wang, as Wang was the only officer he could depend on by this point.  Li Weiyue agreed, and put Wang Shizhen in charge of security while putting Wang Wujun in command of an army, assisted by Wei Changning (衛常寧), to try to recapture Zhao Prefecture.

As soon as Wang Wujun left Heng Prefecture, however, he considered surrendering to Zhang.  Wei, however, persuaded him that it would be his best course to simply turn against Li Weiyue and capture him.  Wang agreed, and therefore turned his army around and headed for Heng Prefecture.  Wang Shizhen and Wang Wujun's associate Xie Zun (謝遵) opened the city gates to welcome Wang Wujun in.  Wang Wujun captured Li Weiyue and executed his close associates, including Bi, Zheng, and the powerful servant Wang Tanu (王它奴).  Initially, because of Wang Wujun's prior service under Li Baochen, he considered sparing Li Weiyue and delivering him to Chang'an.  Wei pointed out that if he did so, Li Weiyue might blame the entire rebellion on Wang instead.  Wang therefore strangled Li Weiyue to death, and then cut off his head and delivered it to Chang'an.

Notes and references 

 Old Book of Tang, vol. 142.
 New Book of Tang, vol. 211.
 Zizhi Tongjian, vols. 226, 227.

8th-century births
782 deaths
Tang dynasty generals